Standings and results for Group 4 of the UEFA Euro 2000 qualifying tournament.

Standings

Matches

Goalscorers

References

Group 4
1999–2000 in Ukrainian football
1998–99 in Ukrainian football
qual
1998–99 in French football
1998 in Russian football
1999 in Russian football
1998 in Armenian football
1999 in Armenian football
1998–99 in Andorran football
1999–2000 in Andorran football
1998 in Icelandic football
1999 in Icelandic football